A digital twin is a digital representation of an intended or actual real-world physical product, system, or process (a physical twin) that serves as the effectively indistinguishable digital counterpart of it for practical purposes, such as simulation, integration, testing, monitoring, and maintenance. The digital twin has been intended from its initial introduction to be the underlying premise for Product Lifecycle Management and exists throughout the entire lifecycle, create, build, operate/support, and dispose, of the physical entity it represents. Since information is granular, the digital twin representation is determined by the value based use cases it is created to implement.  The digital twin can and does often exist before there is a physical entity. The use of a digital twin in the create phase allows the intended entity's entire lifecycle to be modeled and simulated. A digital twin of an existing entity can, but must not necessarily, be used in real time and regularly synchronized with the corresponding physical system.

Though the concept originated earlier, the first practical definition of a digital twin originated from NASA in an attempt to improve physical-model simulation of spacecraft in 2010. Digital twins are the result of continual improvement in the creation of product design and engineering activities. Product drawings and engineering specifications have progressed from handmade drafting to computer-aided drafting/computer-aided design to model-based systems engineering and strict link to signal from the physical counterpart.

History 
Digital twins were anticipated by David Gelernter's 1991 book Mirror Worlds. The concept and model of the digital twin was first publicly introduced in 2002 by Michael Grieves, at a Society of Manufacturing Engineers conference in Troy, Michigan. Grieves proposed the digital twin as the conceptual model underlying product lifecycle management (PLM).

The digital twin concept, which has been known by different names (e.g., virtual twin), was subsequently called the "digital twin" by John Vickers of NASA in a 2010 Roadmap Report. The digital twin concept consists of three distinct parts: the physical object or process and its physical environment, the digital representation of the object or process, and the communication channel between the physical and virtual representations. The connections between the physical version and the digital version include information flows and data that includes physical sensor flows between the physical and virtual objects and environments. The communication connection is referred to as the digital thread.

The International Council of Systems Engineers (INCOSE) maintains in its Systems Engineering Book of Knowledge (SEBoK) that: "A digital twin is a related yet distinct concept to digital engineering. The digital twin is a high-fidelity model of the system which can be used to emulate the actual system." The evolving US DoD Digital Engineering Strategy initiative, first formulated in 2018, defines a digital twin as "an integrated multiphysics, multiscale, probabilistic simulation of an as-built system, enabled by a Digital Thread, that uses the best available models, sensor information, and input data to mirror and predict activities/performance over the life of its corresponding physical twin."

Types 
Digital twins are commonly divided into subtypes that sometimes include: digital twin prototype (DTP),  digital twin instance (DTI), and digital twin aggregate (DTA). The DTP consists of the designs, analyses, and processes that realize a physical product. The DTP exists before there is a physical product. The DTI is the digital twin of each individual instance of the product once it is manufactured. The DTI is linked with its physical counterpart from the remainder of the physical counterpart's life. The DTA is the aggregation of DTIs whose data and information can be used for interrogation about the physical product, prognostics, and learning. The specific information contained in the digital twins is driven by use cases. The digital twin is a logical construct, meaning that the actual data and information may be contained in other applications.

Characteristics 
Digital twin technologies have certain characteristics that distinguish them from other technologies:

Connectivity 
One of the main characteristics of digital twin technology is its connectivity. The recent development of the Internet of Things (IoT) brings forward numerous new technologies. The development of IoT also brings forward the development of digital twin technology. This technology shows many characteristics that have similarities with the character of the IoT, namely its connective nature. First and foremost, the technology enables connectivity between the physical component and its digital counterpart. The basis of digital twins is based on this connection, without it, digital twin technology would not exist. As described in the previous section, this connectivity is created by sensors on the physical product which obtain data and integrate and communicate this data through various integration technologies. Digital twin technology enables increased connectivity between organizations, products, and customers. For example, connectivity between partners and customers in a supply chain can be increased by enabling members of this supply chain to check the digital twin of a product or asset. These partners can then check the status of this product by simply checking the digital twin.

Servitization is the process of organizations that are adding value to their core corporate offerings through services. In the case of the example of engines, the manufacturing of the engine is the core offering of this organization, they then add value by providing a service of checking the engine and offering maintenance.

Homogenization 
Digital twins can be further characterized as a digital technology that is both the consequence and an enabler of the homogenization of data. Due to the fact that any type of information or content can now be stored and transmitted in the same digital form, it can be used to create a virtual representation of the product (in the form of a digital twin), thus decoupling the information from its physical form. Therefore, the homogenization of data and the decoupling of the information from its physical artifact, have allowed digital twins to come into existence. However, digital twins also enable increasingly more information on physical products to be stored digitally and become decoupled from the product itself.

As data is increasingly digitized, it can be transmitted, stored and computed in fast and low-cost ways. According to Moore's law, computing power will continue to increase exponentially over the coming years, while the cost of computing decreases significantly. This would, therefore, lead to lower marginal costs of developing digital twins and make it comparatively much cheaper to test, predict, and solve problems on virtual representations rather than testing on physical models and waiting for physical products to break before intervening.

Another consequence of the homogenization and decoupling of information is that the user experience converges. As information from physical objects is digitized, a single artifact can have multiple new affordances. Digital twin technology allows detailed information about a physical object to be shared with a larger number of agents, unconstrained by physical location or time. In his white paper on digital twin technology in the manufacturing industry, Michael Grieves noted the following about the consequences of homogenization enabled by digital twins:

Reprogrammable and smart 
As stated above, a digital twin enables a physical product to be reprogrammable in a certain way. Furthermore, the digital twin is also reprogrammable in an automatic manner. Through the sensors on the physical product, artificial intelligence technologies, and predictive analytics, A consequence of this reprogrammable nature is the emergence of functionalities. If we take the example of an engine again, digital twins can be used to collect data about the performance of the engine and if needed adjust the engine, creating a newer version of the product. Also, servitization can be seen as a consequence of the reprogrammable nature as well. Manufactures can be responsible for observing the digital twin, making adjustments, or reprogramming the digital twin when needed and they can offer this as an extra service.

Digital trace making 
Another characteristic that can be observed, is the fact that digital twin technologies leave digital traces. These traces can be used by engineers for example, when a machine malfunctions to go back and check the traces of the digital twin, to diagnose where the problem occurred. These diagnoses can in the future also be used by the manufacturer of these machines, to improve their designs so that these same malfunctions will occur less often in the future.

Modularity 
In the sense of the manufacturing industry, modularity can be described as the design and customization of products and production modules. By adding modularity to the manufacturing models, manufacturers gain the ability to tweak models and machines. Digital twin technology enables manufacturers to track the machines that are used and notice possible areas of improvement in the machines. When these machines are made modular, by using digital twin technology, manufacturers can see which components make the machine perform poorly and replace these with better fitting components to improve the manufacturing process.

Examples 

An example of digital twins is the use of 3D modeling to create digital companions for the physical objects. It can be used to view the status of the actual physical object, which provides a way to project physical objects into the digital world. For example, when sensors collect data from a connected device, the sensor data can be used to update a "digital twin" copy of the device's state in real time. The term "device shadow" is also used for the concept of a digital twin. The digital twin is meant to be an up-to-date and accurate copy of the physical object's properties and states, including shape, position, gesture, status and motion.

A digital twin also can be used for monitoring, diagnostics and prognostics to optimize asset performance and utilization. In this field, sensory data can be combined with historical data, human expertise and fleet and simulation learning to improve the outcome of prognostics. Therefore, complex prognostics and intelligent maintenance system platforms can use digital twins in finding the root cause of issues and improve productivity.

Digital twins of autonomous vehicles and their sensor suite embedded in a traffic and environment simulation have also been proposed as a means to overcome the significant development, testing and validation challenges for the automotive application, in particular when the related algorithms are based on artificial intelligence approaches that require extensive training data and validation data sets.

Industrial use cases

Manufacturing industry 
The physical manufacturing objects are virtualized and represented as digital twin models (avatars) seamlessly and closely integrated in both the physical and cyber spaces. Physical objects and twin models interact in a mutually beneficial manner.

The digital twin is disrupting the entire product lifecycle management (PLM), from design, to manufacturing to service and operations. Nowadays, PLM is very time-consuming in terms of efficiency, manufacturing, intelligence, service phases and sustainability in product design. A digital twin can merge the product physical and virtual space. The digital twin enables companies to have a digital footprint of all of their products, from design to development and throughout the entire product life cycle. Broadly speaking, industries with manufacturing business are highly disrupted by digital twins. In the manufacturing process, the digital twin is like a virtual replica of the near-time occurrences in the factory. Thousands of sensors are being placed throughout the physical manufacturing process, all collecting data from different dimensions, such as environmental conditions, behavioural characteristics of the machine and work that is being performed. All this data is continuously communicating and collected by the digital twin.

Due to the Internet of Things, digital twins have become more affordable and could drive the future of the manufacturing industry. A benefit for engineers lies in real-world usage of products that are virtually being designed by the digital twin. Advanced ways of product and asset maintenance and management come within reach as there is a digital twin of the real 'thing' with real-time capabilities.

Digital twins offer a great amount of business potential by predicting the future instead of analyzing the past of the manufacturing process. The representation of reality created by digital twins allows manufacturers to evolve towards ex-ante business practices. The future of manufacturing drives on the following four aspects: modularity, autonomy, connectivity and digital twin. As there is an increasing digitalization in the stages of a manufacturing process, opportunities are opening up to achieve a higher productivity. This starts with modularity and leading to higher effectiveness in the production system. Furthermore, autonomy enables the production system to respond to unexpected events in an efficient and intelligent way. Lastly, connectivity like the Internet of Things, makes the closing of the digitalization loop possible, by then allowing the following cycle of product design and promotion to be optimized for higher performance. This may lead to increase in customer satisfaction and loyalty when products can determine a problem before actually breaking down. Furthermore, as storage and computing costs are becoming less expensive, the ways in which digital twins are used are expanding. Implementation challenges such as data integration, organizational or compliance challenges can hinder the implementation of Digital Twins and its benefits.

Urban planning and construction industry 
Geographic digital twins have been popularised in urban planning practice, given the increasing appetite for digital technology in the Smart Cities movement. These digital twins are often proposed in the form of interactive platforms to capture and display real-time 3D and 4D spatial data in order to model urban environments (cities) and the data feeds within them.

Visualization technologies such as augmented reality (AR) systems are being used as both collaborative tools for design and planning in the built environment integrating data feeds from embedded sensors in cities and API services to form digital twins. For example, AR can be used to create augmented reality maps, buildings, and data feeds projected onto tabletops for collaborative viewing by built environment professionals.

In the built environment, partly through the adoption of building information modeling (BIM) processes, planning, design, construction, and operation and maintenance activities are increasingly being digitised, and digital twins of built assets are seen as a logical extension - at an individual asset level and at a national level. In the United Kingdom in November 2018, for example, the Centre for Digital Built Britain published The Gemini Principles, outlining principles to guide development of a "national digital twin".

One of the earliest examples of a working 'digital twin' was achieved in 1996 during construction of the Heathrow Express facilities at Heathrow Airport's Terminal 1. Consultant Mott MacDonald and BIM pioneer Jonathan Ingram connected movement sensors in the cofferdam and boreholes to the digital object-model to display movements in the model. A digital grouting object was made to monitor the effects of pumping grout into the earth to stabilise ground movements.

Digital twins have also been proposed as a method to reduce the need for visual inspections of buildings and infrastructure after earthquakes by using unmanned vehicles to gather data to be added to a virtual model of the affected area.

Healthcare industry 
Healthcare is recognized as an industry being disrupted by the digital twin technology. The concept of digital twin in the healthcare industry was originally proposed and first used in product or equipment prognostics. With a digital twin, lives can be improved in terms of medical health, sports and education by taking a more data-driven approach to healthcare. The availability of technologies makes it possible to build personalized models for patients, continuously adjustable based on tracked health and lifestyle parameters. This can ultimately lead to a virtual patient, with detailed description of the healthy state of an individual patient and not only on previous records. Furthermore, the digital twin enables individual's records to be compared to the population in order to easier find patterns with great detail. The biggest benefit of the digital twin on the healthcare industry is the fact that healthcare can be tailored to anticipate on the responses of individual patients. Digital twins will not only lead to better resolutions when defining the health of an individual patient but also change the expected image of a healthy patient. Previously, 'healthy' was seen as the absence of disease indications. Now, 'healthy' patients can be compared to the rest of the population in order to really define healthy. However, the emergence of the digital twin in healthcare also brings some downsides. The digital twin may lead to inequality, as the technology might not be accessible for everyone by widening the gap between the rich and poor. Furthermore, the digital twin will identify patterns in a population which may lead to discrimination.

Automotive industry 
The automobile industry has been improved by digital twin technology. Digital twins in the automobile industry are implemented by using existing data in order to facilitate processes and reduce marginal costs. Currently, automobile designers expand the existing physical materiality by incorporating software-based digital abilities. A specific example of digital twin technology in the automotive industry is where automotive engineers use digital twin technology in combination with the firm's analytical tool in order to analyze how a specific car is driven. In doing so, they can suggest incorporating new features in the car that can reduce car accidents on the road, which was previously not possible in such a short time frame. Digital twins can be built for not just individual vehicles but also the whole mobility system, where humans (e.g., drivers, passengers, pedestrians), vehicles (e.g., connected vehicles, connected and automated vehicles), and traffics (e.g., traffic networks, traffic infrastructures) can seek guidance from their digital twins deployed on edge/cloud servers to actuate real-time decisions.

Related technologies 

 Digital Earth
 Digital engineering
 Digital workplace
 Discrete event simulation
 Finite element method
 Health and usage monitoring systems
 
 Industry 4.0
 Integrated vehicle health management
 Internet of things
 Predictive engineering analytics

External links 

 Digital Control Twin and Supply Chain 
 IEEE  - Digital Twin: Enabling Technologies, Challenges and Open Research 
  ISO/DIS 23247-1 Automation systems and integration — Digital Twin framework for manufacturing — Part 1: Overview and general principles

References 

Augmented reality